St Edward's Sapphire is an octagonal, rose-cut sapphire that forms part of the British Crown Jewels.

Its history is older than any other gemstone in the royal collection. The stone is thought to have been in the coronation ring of Edward the Confessor, known later as St Edward, who ascended the throne of England in 1042, twenty-four years before the Norman conquest. Edward, one of the last Anglo-Saxon kings of England, was buried with the ring at Westminster Abbey in 1066.

It was reputedly taken from the ring when Edward's body was re-interred at Westminster Abbey in 1163.

How the gem survived the English Civil War in the 17th century is not clear, but it was most likely re-cut into its present form for Charles II after the restoration of the monarchy.

Queen Victoria added the jewel to the Imperial State Crown, giving it a leading role in the centre of the cross at the top of the crown, where it remains today in the similar crown last worn by Queen Elizabeth II.

St Edward's Sapphire is on public display with the other Crown Jewels in the Jewel House at the Tower of London.

The sapphire is believed to have originated from Asia, potentially either from Afghanistan or Sri Lanka, which have been famed for their gem-producing corundum deposits since ancient times.

See also
 List of individual gemstones

References

Individual sapphires
Crown Jewels of the United Kingdom
Edward the Confessor